En plats i solen (Swedish for A Place in the Sun) is the ninth studio album by Swedish alternative rock band Kent. It was released on 30 June 2010, just eight months after the release of their previous album, Röd, but was released exclusively as digital download on the band's website on 23 June. The album is produced primarily with Swedish producer Stefan Boman, who worked with the band on Du & jag döden from 2005. The lead single, "Gamla Ullevi" / "Skisser för sommaren", was released on 14 June 2010, the same day as the band announced the album details. En plats i solen has peaked at number one in Sweden and Finland, number two in Norway and number four in Denmark.

The album was written and recorded in the early spring of 2010, and was finished on 8 June. Some of the songs are leftovers from the recording of Röd. Lead singer Joakim Berg told Svenska Dagbladet that they wanted to record the songs "while they were still fresh".

Track listing

Personnel 
Joakim Berg – lyrics and music
Martin Sköld – music on track 1, 2, 4, 7, 8, 9
Kent – production
Stefan Boman – production and mixing
Joshua – production on track 2, 3, 5
Hoffe Stannow – mastering
Martin Brengesjö – instrument technician
Sebastian Meyer – recording assistant, percussion, choir on track 3
Joakim Milder – strings arrangement and conductor
Stockholm Session Strings – strings
Anders "Boba" Lindström – choir on track 4
Lars Winnerbäck – choir on track 4
Heikki Kiviaho – choir on track 7
Rebecka Törnqvist – duet on track 10

Charts and certifications

Weekly charts

Year-end charts

Certifications

References 

2010 albums
Kent (band) albums
Swedish-language albums
Albums produced by Joshua (record producer)